The 2013 Houston Cougars football team represented the University of Houston in the 2013 NCAA Division I FBS football season. It was the 68th year of season play for Houston. The season marked the first for the Cougars as a member of the American Athletic Conference. Due to construction of the new TDECU Stadium during the 2013 season, the team played its home games at other locations in Houston.

The season featured the Cougars’ continued Bayou Bucket Classic rivalry with the Rice Owls. The game again became a  battle due to the departure from Conference USA for the Cougars following the 2012 season. The previous time the two teams met as non-conference foes was during the 2004 season when the Rice Owls was a member of the Western Athletic Conference. The 2013 Bayou Bucket Classic was played at Reliant Stadium.

They finished the season 8–5, 5–3 in American Athletic play to finish in fourth place. They were invited to the BBVA Compass Bowl where they were defeated by Vanderbilt.

Previous season
With a 5–7 overall record, the 2012 season was a step backward for the program, as it compiled only its second losing season since 2005.  The team suffered an early season humiliating loss against Texas State in Houston's season opener, and offensive coordinator Mike Nesbitt was forced to resign after only one game.  First year head coach Tony Levine promoted Travis Bush to fill the position.  It was the final season that the team would play its home games at the on-campus Robertson Stadium, as it was closed and demolished soon after the season finished.

Preseason

Recruits
For the 2013 recruiting class, Houston attained its highest overall class ranking since 2010, and its second-highest ranking ever by Rivals.com.  However, Scout.com only gave Houston its seventh-best overall ranking.

Schedule

Coaching staff

Game summaries

UTSA

 Source:

BYU

Sources:

Poll rankings

References

Houston
Houston Cougars football seasons
Houston Cougars football